Benudhar Sharma ( Beṇudhara Śarmmā, 1894–1981) was a noted writer, translator, journalist, historical researcher, and freedom fighter from Assam. He was a recipient of the civilian honour of the Padma Bhushan and was the second Assamese writer who won the Sahitya Akademi Award. He was the president of the Assam Sahitya Sabha in 1956.

Literacy works

References

External links
 Benudhar Sharma at vedanti.com

Asom Sahitya Sabha Presidents
1894 births
Poets from Assam
People from Sivasagar district
Assamese-language poets
1981 deaths
Recipients of the Sahitya Akademi Award in Assamese
Recipients of the Padma Bhushan in literature & education
20th-century Indian poets
20th-century Indian male writers